Frank Edward Manuel (12 September 1910 – 2003) was an American historian, Kenan Professor of History, emeritus, at New York University and Alfred and Viola Hart University Professor, emeritus, at Brandeis University. He was known for his work on the idea of utopia. In 1980, he and his wife, Fritzie P. Manuel, won the Ralph Waldo Emerson Award for their book Utopian Thought in the Western World (1979). In 1983 they won the National Book Award for the paperback edition of the same work.

Early life and family
Manuel was born in Boston on 12 September 1910. He attended Harvard University, earning his A.B. in 1930, his M.A. in 1931, and his Ph.D. in 1933. He married Fritzie Prigohzy on 6 October 1936.

Career
Manuel taught at Harvard from 1935 to 1937, after which he had a number of short-term jobs and began to teach at Brandeis University, where he stayed until 1965, when he joined New York University. He returned to Brandeis in 1977. He was Kenan Professor of History, emeritus, at New York University and Alfred and Viola Hart University Professor, emeritus, at Brandeis University.

Manuel was known for his work on the history of the idea of Utopias. In 1980, he and Fritzie won the Ralph Waldo Emerson Award for their book Utopian Thought in the Western World (1979), which the Times Higher Education Supplement described as "the starting point for all Utopian scholarship". In 1983 they won the National Book Award for the paperback edition of the same work.

Selected publications
The Age of Reason. 1951.
The Eighteenth Century Confronts the Gods. 1959.
The Prophets of Paris. 1962.
Shapes of Philosophical History. 1965.
A Portrait of Isaac Newton. Harvard University Press, 1968.
 The Religion of Isaac Newton. Clarendon Press, 1977
Utopian Thought in the Western World, with Fritzie P. Manuel. Basil Blackwell, Oxford, 1979. .
The Changing of the Gods. 1983.
The Broken Staff: Judaism Through Christian Eyes. 1992.
A Requiem for Karl Marx. Harvard University Press, 1995.
James Bowdoin and the Patriot Philosophers, with Fritzie P. Manuel. 2004.

References

Further reading
Bienvenu, R.T.; Feingold, M. (eds.) (1991). In the Presence of the Past: Essays in Honor of Frank Manuel. Kluwer Academic.

External links
 

1910 births
2003 deaths
People from Boston
New York University faculty
Brandeis University faculty
Harvard University alumni
20th-century American historians
American male non-fiction writers
Historians from Massachusetts
20th-century American male writers